The 1000-ton Floating Dock was a class of floating dry docks built for the Royal Australian Navy between 1940 and 1944.

Design
The floating docks had a lifting capacity of 1,000 tons.

Floating Docks
 AD 1001, built by Evans Deakin & Company, launched on 24 April 1941 and completed on 3 October 1941. Sold by Hobsons Bay Dock and Engineering Co. to Seico Shipyard of Singapore in 1978.
 AD 1002, built by Mort's Dock & Engineering Company and completed in 1944. Currently operated by the Noakes Group, Berry Bay, Sydney.

References
 

Auxiliary ships of the Royal Australian Navy
Ships built in New South Wales
Ships built in Queensland